Sion Creek is a creek in central Mumbai near Sion. The creek divides the city from the suburbs. It empties out into the Thane Creek to the east.

References 

Estuaries of Mumbai